Melvin Earl Jones (born September 27, 1956) is a former American football offensive lineman in the National Football League for the Washington Redskins.  

He played college football at the University of Houston and was drafted in the seventh round of the 1980 NFL Draft.  After getting phlebitis at the 1980 training camp, he was the injured reserve list for that season.  He played during the 1981 season, but was cut from the 1982 team.

References

1954 births
Living people
American football offensive guards
Houston Cougars football players
Washington Redskins players
Players of American football from Houston